This is a list of United States national Golden Gloves champions in the middleweight division, along with the state or region they represented.

1928 - Charles Benoit - Chicago
1929 - Johnny Ross - Chicago
1930 - Edward Steeve - Chicago
1931 - Fred Caserio - Chicago
1932 - Charles Neigo - Chicago
1933 - Fred Caserio - Chicago
1934 - Bill Treest - Chicago
1935 - Dave Clark - Detroit
1936 - Milton Shivers - Detroit
1937 - Al Wardlow - Dayton
1938 - Cornelius Young - Chicago
1939 - Ezzard Charles - Cincinnati
1940 - Joe Maxim - Cleveland
1941 - Charles Hayes - Detroit
1942 - Brenny McCombe - Grand Rapids
1943 - Samson Powell - Cleveland
1944 - Collins Brown - Chicago
1945 - John Garcia - Los Angeles
1946 - Stanley Shealey - Chicago
1947 - Nick Ranieri - Chicago
1948 - Alvin Williams - Oklahoma City
1949 - Joe Leudanski - Chicago
1950 - Junior Perry - St. Louis
1951 - Richard Guerrero - Chicago
1952 - Carl Blair - Great Lakes
1953 - Bill Late - Great Lakes
1954 - Paul Wright - Kansas City
1955 - Jesse Bowdry - St. Louis
1956 - Ed Cook - Montgomery
1957 - Leotis Martin - Toledo
1958 - Wilbert McClure - Toledo
1959 - Leotis Martin - Toledo
1960 - Leotis Martin - Toledo
1961 - James Ellis - Louisville
1962 - Gary Brown - Denver
1963 - Bill Dolugas - Columbus
1964 - Robert McMillan - Toledo
1965 - Al Jones- Detroit
1966 - Johnny Edwards - Joplin Mo
1967 - Paul Badhorse - Los Angeles
1968 - Roy Dale - Cincinnati
1969 - Roosevelt Molden - Lowell
1970 - Larry Wood - Grand Rapids
1971 - Jerry Dobbs - Knoxville
1972 - Marvin Johnson - Indianapolis
1973 - Roy Hollis - Los Angeles
1974 - Vonzell Johnson - Columbus
1975 - Davis Mills - Memphis
1976 - Michael Spinks - St. Louis
1977 - Keith Broom - Knoxville
1978 - Wilford Scypion - Fort Worth
1979 - Tony Ayala, Jr. - Fort Worth
1980 - Lamont Kirkland - Omaha
1981 - Donald V. Lee - Fort Worth
1982 - Arthel Lawhorn - Detroit
1983 - Arthur Jimmerson - St. Louis
1984 - Virgil Hill - Minneapolis
1985 - William Guthrie - St Louis
1986 - Lamonte Harts- Colorado
1987 - Fabian Williams - Grand Rapids
1988 - Keith Providence - Syracuse
1989 - Ron Belliveau - Boston
1990 - Frank Vassar - Nevada
1991 - Frank Savanna - New Jersey
1992 - Anthony Steward - Chicago
1993 - Tarvis Simms - New England
1994 - Anthony W Melberg -  California
1994 - Tomas Diaz  - Chicago
1995 - Jose Spearman - Cincinnati
1996 - Byron Mitchell - Milwaukee
1997 - Dana Rucker - Washington
1998 - Jerson Ravelo - New Jersey
1999 - Arthur Palac - Detroit
2000 - Eric Kelly - Wisconsin
2001 - Alfred Kinsey
2002 - Jaidon Codrington - New England
2003 - Blake E. Cruz - Colorado
2004 - Joe Greene - New York City
2005 - Daniel Jacobs - New York City
2006 - Edwin Rodriguez - New England
2007 - Shawn Porter - Cleveland
2008 - Denis Douglin - Morganville, NJ
2009 - Naim Terbunja - New York Metro
2010 - Salvador J Martinez - Idaho
2011 - Jesse Hart - Pennsylvania
2012 - D'Mitrius Ballard - Maryland
2013 - Damion Scarborough  - Georgia
2014 - Edgardo Martinez - Massachusetts
2015 - Charles Conwell - Cleveland
2016 - Isiah Jones - Detroit
2017 - Poindexter Knight - Pennsylvania

References

Golden Gloves